Zaranj District is a district of Nimruz Province, Afghanistan, containing the provincial capital city of Zaranj.

Route 606 connects Zaranj to Delaram which helps the Trade, and the toll-customs revenues have grown.

Demographics
In 2004, Zaranj had a population of 49,851 people in 242 villages.  The population was given as Baloch 44%, Pashtun 34% and Tajik 22%.

Agriculture
Per a 2007 report from the Ministry of Rural Rehabilitation and Development, the district grows maize, wheat, melon, watermelon, millet and lentil.

References

Districts of Nimruz Province